Vladimir Prijović (born 26 June 2002) is a Serbian professional footballer who plays for as a centre-back for Napredak Kruševac.

Career

Club career
Prijović is a product of Red Star Belgrade. He was loaned out to Grafičar in the 2019-20 season, where he made one appearance for the club in the Serbian First League.

On 11 August 2020, Danish Superliga club AaB bought 18-year old Prijović for a fee around €210.000, with the player signing a four-year deal. In his first season at the club, Prijović only played for AaB's U-19 squad and reserve team. He made a total of two appearances for the Danish club, both in the Danish Superliga in 2021-22.

On 27 July 2022, Prijović returned to his homeland, as he signed with Napredak Kruševac.

References

External links

2002 births
Living people
Serbian footballers
Serbian expatriate footballers
Association football defenders
Serbia youth international footballers
Danish Superliga players
Serbian First League players
Red Star Belgrade footballers
RFK Grafičar Beograd players
AaB Fodbold players
FK Napredak Kruševac players
Serbian expatriate sportspeople in Denmark
Expatriate men's footballers in Denmark
People from Priboj